The Siemens AX72 is a mobile phone introduced by Siemens in October, 2005. It weighs 79 g and its dimensions are 105,6 x 46,8 x 17,5 mm (length x width x depth). Its display a CSTN 65K colors LCD.

The phone's battery powers the phone for 5 hours talk time, or up to 220 hours if left in stand-by mode. It also supports SMS sending and receiving.

Characteristics 
General:
2G Network: GSM 900 / 1800 / 1900
Announced: 2005, October
Status: Discontinued
Size:
Dimensions: 105.6 x 46.8 x 17.5 mm
Weight: 79 g
Display Type: CSTN, 65K colors
Size: 128 x 128 pixels - 5-way navigation key
Ringtones:
Type: Polyphonic (32 channels)
Customization: Download
Vibration: Yes
Memory:
Phonebook: Yes
Call records: 10 dialed, 10 received, 10 missed calls
Card slot: No - 1.5 MB free memory
Data:
GPRS: Class 8 (4+1 slots), 32 - 40 kbit/s
HSCSD: No
EDGE: No
3G: No
WLAN: No
Bluetooth: No
Infrared port: No
USB: Yes
Features:
Messaging: SMS, EMS, MMS
Browser WAP: 1.2.1
Games: Yes
Colors: Basalt Black
Camera: No
Java: MIDP 1.0
T9
Calendar
Built-in handsfree
External flash as accessory
Optional digital camera (VGA 640 x 480)
Battery:
Standard battery, Li-Ion 600 mAh
Stand-by Up: to 220 h
Talk time: Up to 5 h

References

External links 
 User Manuals / User Guides for AX72 from Manualsmania

AX72